Chlumetia is a genus of moths of the family Euteliidae. The genus was erected by Francis Walker in 1866.

Description
Palpi with second joint reaching vertex of head and thick scales, where the third joint short. Antennae of male bipectinated. Thorax smoothly scaled. Abdomen with dorsal tufts. Tibia moderately hairy. Forewings with hardly a trace of raised buttons of scaled. Veins 8 and 9 anastomosing to for a short areole. Hindwing with veins 3,4,5 arise from lower angle of cell.

Species
Chlumetia albiapicata (Hampson, 1902) South Africa
Chlumetia alternans Moore, 1882 Darjiling
Chlumetia borbonica Guillermet, 1992 Reunion
Chlumetia brevisigna Holloway, 1985 India, Sri Lanka, Singapore, Java, Philippines
Chlumetia cana Hampson, 1912 Tanzania
Chlumetia dulita Holloway, 1985 Borneo
Chlumetia euryptera Hampson, 1912 New Guinea
Chlumetia euthysticha (Turner, 1941) Borneo, Ternate, New Guinea, northern Queensland, Solomons
Chlumetia griseapicata Laporte, 1970 Ivory Coast
Chlumetia hampsoni (Bethune-Baker, 1906) New Guinea
Chlumetia insularis Prout, 1927 Sao Tome
Chlumetia kinabalua Holloway, 1985 Borneo
Chlumetia lichenosa (Hampson, 1902) Angola, South Africa, Zimbabwe
Chlumetia malaysiana Holloway, 1985 Peninsular Malaysia
Chlumetia melanesiana Holloway, 1985 Solomons
Chlumetia montalbana Holloway, 1985 Philippines
Chlumetia multilineata Wileman & West, 1928 Philippines
Chlumetia polymorpha Hampson, 1920 South Africa, Zimbabwe
Chlumetia postrubra Holloway, 1985 Peninsular Malaysia, Borneo, Sulawesi
Chlumetia transversa (Walker, 1863) Indo-Australian tropics to the Solomons
Chlumetia trisigna Holloway, 1985 Bali

References

Euteliinae
Noctuoidea genera